Ramiro Agustín Balbuena Chamorro (born 28 February 2000) is an Argentine professional footballer who plays as a right midfielder for Estudiantes RC on loan from Arsenal de Sarandí.

Career
Balbuena is a product of the Arsenal de Sarandí academy. The left midfielder was initially promoted to Sergio Rondina's first-team midway through 2019, though suffered a serious leg injury in August. He returned to the first-team ahead of the 2020–21 campaign. After being an unused substitute for a Copa de la Liga Profesional home loss to Atlético Tucumán on 8 November, Balbuena's senior debut arrived a week later in a defeat to Racing Club; he replaced Nicolás Castro after sixty-seven minutes.

Career statistics
.

Notes

References

External links

2000 births
Living people
People from Puerto Iguazú
Argentine footballers
Association football midfielders
Arsenal de Sarandí footballers
Estudiantes de Río Cuarto footballers
Sportspeople from Misiones Province